The Utah State Library in Salt Lake City, Utah is a division of the Utah Department of Heritage and Arts.

History
The Utah State Library Commission was created in 1957 when Governor George D. Clyde appointed a ten-person library commission in accordance with a recently passed state law.  The library was originally housed in the Governor's Mansion before it moved to the state fair grounds and ultimately was moved to 2150 South 300 West in Salt Lake City. In 1998 it moved to its current location at 250 North 1950 West in Salt Lake City.

Purpose
The Utah State Library "provides funding, training, professional expertise and technical advice to library directors, staff, and trustees all across Utah."

Programs & Services

Library Development Program
The Library Development Program supports Utah's libraries and librarians and promotes the improvement of library service through training, grant funding, consulting, youth services, outreach, and more.

Certification & Recertification Standards for Utah's Public Libraries
Consultants for Public Libraries
E-Rate: Schools and Libraries Program of the Universal Service Fund
Grants for Libraries
Community Library Enhancement Fund (CLEF)
Library Services and Technology Act (LSTA)
Utah Public Library Institute for Training (UPLIFT) Grants
Library Outreach
 Library Trustee Center
State Data: Statistical Annual Reports, Public Library Statistics, & Library Data Tools
Training, Continuing Education, & Professional Development
Online Webinars
Utah Public Library Institute For Training (UPLIFT)
Youth Services
Book Your Summer in partnership with my529
Summer Reading Program
Utah Kids Ready to Read!

Library Resources Program 
The Library Resources Program supports Utah's libraries and librarians and promotes access to library resources through interlibrary loan, lender support, book club book sets, government publications, online resources, and more.

 Book Buzz for Book Groups
 Interlibrary Loan
 Utah Government Digital Library
 Utah's Online Public Library (formerly Pioneer: Utah's Online Library)

Program for the Blind and Disabled 
The Utah State Library Program for the Blind and Disabled provides free braille and audio books for people who either permanently or temporarily cannot read or use conventional printed materials due to visual or physical limitations, i.e., blindness, a visual disability, a physical inability to hold a book, and/or a print disability. This includes people in private homes, nursing homes, hospitals, schools and other institutions.

Utah Bookmobiles Program 
Bookmobiles are a service provided through a cooperative contract with the Utah State Library and local counties and cities. They provide full library service to citizens living in rural communities including: Garfield, Iron, Juab, Kane, Piute, Sanpete, Sevier, Wayne, and Utah counties and the city of Vernon in Tooele County. Five bookmobiles are headquartered throughout the state making service available Monday through Thursday at over 200 stops.

State Librarians
 Russell Davis (1957-1987)
 Amy Owen (1987-2004)
 Donna Jones Morris  (2004–2018)
 Colleen Eggett  (2018-2021)
 Chaundra Johnson  (2021-Present)

References

External links
 Utah State Library's Website
 Utah State Library for the Blind and Disabled
 Utah Bookmobiles
 Utah's Online Public Library
 Utah Government Digital Library

State libraries of the United States
Libraries in Utah
1957 establishments in Utah